Kramatorsk railway station is a railway station in Kramatorsk, Ukraine, served by Donets Railway. It is located at a junction of north-south and east-west lines connecting the city to other centres in the country including Kyiv, Odessa, and Kostiantynivka.

History
The station was built when construction of the railway line began south of Sloviansk in 1868 and the Kramatorsk site was in a suitable position, being at a junction of lines. At first the railway was a single track. It was completed in 1879 and the building, now made of stone, had two floors. In the same years the settlement grew. During World War II the historical building was destroyed and in 1952 it was rebuilt according to the design of architect Syromyatnikov. An old locomotive was placed in the station forecourt in 2021 as a monument, commemorating the model produced by the Soviet Union until 1957.

Russian invasion 

The station was damaged and numerous civilians were killed and injured by the Kramatorsk railway bombing in April 2022 during the Russian invasion. The attack killed at least 50 people, who were civilians trying to evacuate. It is unknown if or when passenger rail service will resume after the attack.

Facilities and services
The station operates 24 hours a day, with freight and long-distance passenger trains, suburban and regional trains. It offers the normal passenger services and holds long-distance transport documents, storage, toilets and others. Next to the station, in the Station Square, there are stops for urban public transport.

Connected to the station there are workshops for the repair and maintenance of railway equipment.

References

Buildings and structures in Kramatorsk
Railway stations opened in 1868
Railway stations in Donetsk Oblast
1868 establishments in Europe